The Archdiocese of San Salvador is a Latin Church ecclesiastical territory or archdiocese of the Catholic Church in El Salvador. Its archepiscopal see is the Salvadoran capital, San Salvador, and the surrounding region.

The current Archbishop of San Salvador is José Luis Escobar Alas. His cathedra is in San Salvador Cathedral, otherwise the Metropolitan Cathedral of the Holy Saviour. The Archdiocese of San Salvador is the sole metropolitan see in El Salvador, with seven suffragan dioceses in its ecclesiastical province: the Dioceses of Chalatenango, San Miguel, San Vicente, Santa Ana, Santiago de María, Sonsonate, and Zacatecoluca.

The Archdiocese of San Salvador has an unusual arrangement in which the auxiliary bishop, Gregorio Rosa Chávez, is a cardinal, whilst the archbishop is not. The Archbishop of San Salvador retains ordinary authority over the archdiocese.

Statistics 
, it pastorally served 2,322,000 Catholics (74.0% of 3,137,000 total) on 3,295 km2 in 162 parishes and 6 missions with 354 priests (158 diocesan, 196 religious), 1 deacon, 1,471 lay religious (343 brothers, 1,128 sisters) and 107 seminarians.

History 
What is currently the territory of the Republic of El Salvador previously was part of the Spanish colonial Captaincy General (governorship) of Guatemala and, ecclesiastically, of the Archdiocese of Guatemala. Until 1842, there were four church regions in El Salvador, which reported to the San Salvador region, the most important one: Santa Ana, Sonsonate, San Vicente and San Miguel.
 Pope Gregory XVI erected the Diocese of the Divine Savior (in Spanish, El Salvador means "The Savior"), separating the territory of the Republic of El Salvador from the Archdiocese of Guatemala, by Papal bull dated 28 September 1842, constituting it as a suffragan diocese of the Archdiocese of Guatemala.
 On 22 February 1913, it was promoted as Metropolitan Archdiocese of San Salvador / Sancti Salvatoris in America (Latin), having lost territory to establish as first suffragan sees Diocese of San Miguel and Diocese of Santa Ana
 It lost territories again : on 18 December 1943, to establish Diocese of San Vicente, and on 30 December 1987, to establish Diocese of Chalatenango, both as its suffragans.
 It enjoyed Papal visits from Pope John Paul II in March 1983 and February 1996.

Twentieth Century policy 
Under three archbishops, Luis Chávez y González, Óscar Arnulfo Romero y Galdámez, and Arturo Rivera y Damas, the archdiocese saw over fifty years of a progressive pastoral ministry influenced by the currents of the Second Vatican Council and a Latin American church trend that later was known as Liberation Theology. Critics interpreted the Church's advocacy for the poor as fomenting a socialist revolution and targeted the clergy for assassination. Two bishops, including Archbishop Romero, were assassinated, as were twenty six priests (including Fr. Rutilio Grande), three nuns and countless catechists and Church workers.

The post-Civil War period saw a return to traditional spirituality under the watch of the conservative Archbishop Fernando Sáenz Lacalle, a former military chaplain and member of Opus Dei.

Sexual abuse cases 
In November 2015, sex abuse scandals in the Archdiocese of San Salvador became public when the archdiocese's third highest ranking priest, Jesus Delgado, who was also the biographer and personal secretary of the Salvadoran Archbishop Oscar Romero was dismissed by the archdiocese after its investigation showed that he had molested a girl, now 42 years of age, when she was between the ages of 9 and 17. Due to the statute of limitations, Delgado could not face criminal charges. In December 2016, a canonical court convicted Delgado and two other El Salvador priests, Francisco Galvez and Antonio Molina, of committing acts of sex abuse between the years 1980 and 2000 and laicized them from the priesthood. In November 2019, the archdiocese acknowledged sex abuse committed by a priest identified as Leopoldo Sosa Tolentino in 1994 and issued a public apology to his victim. Tolentino was suspended from ministry and began the canonical trial process. Another El Salvador priest was laicized in 2019 after pleading guilty to sex abuse in a Vatican trial and is serving a 16-year prison sentence after being convicted in a criminal trial.

Ecclesiastical province 
The ecclesiastical province of San Salvador comprises the whole country, consisting of the Metropolitan's archbishopric and the following suffragan sees:
 Diocese of Chalatenango
 Diocese of San Miguel
 Diocese of San Vicente
 Diocese of Santa Ana
 Diocese of Santiago de María
 Diocese of Sonsonate
 Diocese of Zacatecoluca

Bishops

Ordinaries
Bishops of San Salvador

Archbishops of San Salvador

Coadjutor Bishops
 Mariano Ortiz y Urruela (1866–1873)
 Luis Cárcamo y Rodríguez (1871–1875) (overlapped with Ortiz y Urrela)

Auxiliary Bishops
Tomás Miguel Pineda y Saldaña (1848–1853), appointed Bishop here
 Santiago Ricardo Vilanova y Meléndez (1913–1915), appointed Bishop of Santa Ana
 José Alfonso Belloso y Sánchez (1919–1927), appointed Archbishop here
 Pedro Arnoldo Aparicio y Quintanilla, S.D.B. (1946–1948), appointed Bishop of San Vicente
 Rafael Valladares y Argumedo (1956–1961)
 Arturo Rivera y Damas (1960–1977), appointed Bishop of Santiago de María and later Archbishop of San Salvador
 José Eduardo Alvarez Ramírez, C.M. (1965–1969), appointed Bishop of San Miguel
 Saint Óscar Arnulfo Romero y Galdámez (1970–1974), appointed Bishop of Santiago de María
 Marco René Revelo Contreras (1978–1981), appointed  Bishop of Santa Ana
 Cardinal Gregorio Rosa Chávez (1982–present); elevated to Cardinal in 2017

Other priests of this diocese who became bishops
Juan Antonio Dueñas y Argumedo, appointed Bishop of San Miguel in 1913
Francisco José Castro y Ramírez, appointed Bishop of Santiago de María in 1956
William Ernesto Iraheta Rivera, appointed Bishop of Santiago de María in 2016

See also 
 List of Catholic dioceses in El Salvador

References

External links 
 GCatholic - data for most sections

Roman Catholic dioceses in El Salvador

Religious organizations established in 1842
Roman Catholic dioceses and prelatures established in the 19th century
1842 establishments in El Salvador
A